The 1998 New York City Marathon was the 29th running of the annual marathon race in New York City, United States, which took place on Sunday, November 1. The men's elite race was won by Kenya's John Kagwe in a time of 2:08:45 hours while the women's race was won by Italy's Franca Fiacconi in 2:25:17.
             		  		
A total of 31,539 runners finished the race, 22,587 men and 8952 women.

Results

Men

Women

References

Results
Results. Association of Road Racing Statisticians. Retrieved 2020-05-23.

External links
New York Road Runners website

1998
New York City
Marathon
New York City Marathon